Vohwinkel station is the most western station in the city of Wuppertal. It is located in the district of Vohwinkel. It is a triangular station, built at a railway junction.

History
The original station was built slightly further west than the present station in 1841 by the Düsseldorf-Elberfeld Railway Company. The Prince William Railway was extended to Vohwinkel in 1848, creating a railway junction. The present building was built at the beginning of the 20th century by the Prussian state railways to the design of Alexander Rüdell.

In the early 20th century a three km long marshalling yard was built to the west of the station, but it has since been closed and demolished.

In addition to the Düsseldorf-Elberfeld through line and the branch to the former Prince William line (now the line to Essen), in the past there was a railway line connecting to the now closed Wuppertal Northern Railway and the now closed Corkscrew line from Solingen terminated there.

Services
No long-distance services stop at the station, but it is served by the Wupper-Express (RE 4), the Maas-Wupper-Express (RE 13), the Wupper-Lippe-Express and the (RE 49) Regional-Express services and the Rhein-Wupper-Bahn (RB 48) Regionalbahn service and lines S8, S9, S28 and S68 of the Rhine-Ruhr S-Bahn.

References

Railway stations in Wuppertal
Railway stations in Germany opened in 1841
Rhine-Ruhr S-Bahn stations
S8 (Rhine-Ruhr S-Bahn)
S9 (Rhine-Ruhr S-Bahn)
Art Nouveau architecture in Germany
Art Nouveau railway stations
1841 establishments in Prussia